The Ukrainian Catholic Eparchy of Kamyanets-Podilskyi is an eparchy (Eastern Catholic diocese) of the Ukrainian Greek Catholic Church sui iuris (Byzantine Rite in Ukrainian language) in its homeland Ukraine.

The eparchy is suffragan of the Metropolitan Ukrainian Catholic Archeparchy of Ternopil–Zboriv.

History 
 Established as Eparchy of Kamyanets
 United on 6 December 2004 with its Metropolitan, as title of the Major Archdiocese of Kyiv–Halyč.
 Restored on December 11, 2015 as Eparchy of Kamyanets-Podilskyi, on territory returned from the Ukrainian Catholic Archeparchy of Ternopil–Zboriv, as its suffragan.

Episcopal ordinaries
(all Ukrainian Rite)

Eparchs (Bishops) of Kamianets  (unavailable)

Eparchial Bishops of Kamianets-Podilskyi 
Archiepiscopal Administrator (11 December 2015 - 10 September 2019) Vasyl Semeniuk Metropolitan of Ternopil – Zboriv 
 (since 10 September 2019) Ivan Kulyk

See also 
 Ukrainian Greek Catholic Church
 Catholic Church

References

External links
 Profile at Catholic Hierarchy 
 Profile at Gcatholic.org, with incumbent biography links

Eparchies of the Ukrainian Greek Catholic Church in Ukraine
Dioceses established in the 21st century
Christian organizations established in 2015